A8(M) is a motorway in Glasgow, Scotland, which opened in 2016 after the Scottish Government proposed that the Baillieston Roundabout should be motorway standard and that the A8 was not up to  motorway standards, so work started in early 2015 to upgrade the road. It is the shortest motorway in the United Kingdom. There is no signage of the A8(M) but signposted as the A8 link from the M73 and M8. It does however retain its motorway status.

References

Motorways in Scotland
Transport in Glasgow
2016 establishments in Scotland
Baillieston